Ten. may refer to:
 a common abbreviation in musical notation for tenuto
 the standard botanical author abbreviation of Michele Tenore

See also
 Ten (disambiguation)